James or Jim McCord may refer to:
 James Bennett McCord (1870–1950), American medical missionary, physician, and founder of McCord Zulu Hospital
 James W. McCord Jr. (1924–2017), American CIA officer and Watergate scandal figure
 James I. McCord (1919–1990), Canadian-born president of Princeton Theological Seminary
 Jim Nance McCord (1879–1968), American journalist and governor of Tennessee
 Jim McCord (American football) (1932–2009), American football coach